Navaneeda Krishna Gounder is a former Nadi and Fiji soccer player. He debuted for Nadi in 1977. Gounder was well known for his lethal right boot and is well documented in an incident where his powerful volley led to a fractured hand of a Rewa goalie. He was part of the champion Nadi team which ruled the soccer fraternity in the late 1970s and early 1990s. Incidentally, it was in his reign as the President of Nadi F.C. that brought the glory days to the Nadi Soccer. Under his leadership from 1995, Nadi managed to win the Fiji Fact, Battle of the Giants and Girmit Tourney. In addition to that, Nadi team also were triumphant in the National League and Inter-District Tournament.

Achievements

As a Player 
 League Championship (for Districts): 5
1978, 1980, 1981, 1982, 1983
Battle of the Giants: 3
1978, 1980, 1983

As an Administrator (President) 
 League Championship (for Districts) : 2
 1998, 2000
Battle of the Giants: 1
1996
Fiji Fact: 1
1996
 Inter-District Championship : 3
1998, 1999, 2002
Fiji Football Association Cup Tournament: 1
1996
Girmit Soccer Tournament: 1
1996

Bibliography 
A historic win: Message from the President of the Nadi Soccer Association, The Fiji Times, Suva, .
Navaneeda's looks are deceiving: Inter District 79, The Fiji Times, Suva, .

Fijian footballers
Fiji international footballers
Living people
1957 births
Nadi F.C. players
Sportspeople from Nadi
Fijian people of Indian descent
Suva F.C. players
Association football midfielders